Vera Kolesnikova (born 7 October 1968 in Perlevka)  is a former Soviet artistic gymnast. She was a member of the gold medal winning team at the 1985 World Championships. She was also the 1986 Goodwill Games all-around champion. Kolesnikova retired in 1988 after failing to make the Olympic team. In 1991, she married Russian gymnast, Alexander Komov. They had a son Alexander (known as Sasha), and their daughter Viktoria Komova is a two-time world champion and two-time silver medalist at the 2012 Summer Olympics.

References

1968 births
Living people
Soviet female artistic gymnasts
Russian female artistic gymnasts
World champion gymnasts
Medalists at the World Artistic Gymnastics Championships
Universiade medalists in gymnastics
Universiade gold medalists for the Soviet Union
Universiade silver medalists for the Soviet Union
Goodwill Games medalists in gymnastics
Competitors at the 1986 Goodwill Games